The Institute for the Study of Human Knowledge (ISHK) is a non-profit educational charity and publisher established in 1969 by the psychologist and writer Robert E. Ornstein and based in Los Altos, California, in the United States. Its aim is to provide public education and information on issues of health and human nature.

Founder
Robert Ornstein, psychologist, writer and professor at Stanford University, founded and chaired ISHK. He has published over 25 books on the mind and won awards from organizations including the American Psychological Association and the United Nations Educational, Scientific and Cultural Organization (UNESCO). His work has been featured in a 1974 Time magazine article entitled Hemispheric Thinker. Ornstein is best known for his research on the hemispheric specialization of the brain and the advancement of understanding into how we think. He has also contributed to the London-based Institute for Cultural Research set up by his associate, the writer and Sufi teacher, Idries Shah. The ICR and its associate, Octagon Press have since been replaced by The Idries Shah Foundation and ISF Publishing, respectively.

In 1972, Ornstein published The Psychology of Consciousness.
More recent works include The Right Mind (1997), described as "a cutting edge picture of how the two sides of the brain work".

Robert Ornstein died in December 2018.

Aims and activities
ISHK's primary aim is public education, by providing new information on health and human nature through its book service, through its children's imprint Hoopoe Books and adult imprint Malor Books, which includes the works of Robert Ornstein. Hoopoe Books focuses on publishing traditional children's stories from Afghanistan, Central Asia and the Middle East, including works by Idries Shah, such as The Lion Who Saw Himself in the Water.

The Institute also operates philanthropic projects, including Share Literacy, which provides books for children; support for caregivers; training and support for teachers, and independent program evaluation. Through its Share Literacy Program, Hoopoe Books has partnered with other organizations to give books away to children in low-income areas. It also provides books free of charge to lending libraries.

ISHK has worked with organizations such as The Institute for Cross-cultural Exchange to provide children in Afghanistan with desperately needed books for distribution to schools, orphanages and libraries throughout the country, in order to address the literacy crisis.

Events organized by ISHK include a symposium in 2006 on "The Core of Early Christian Spirituality: Its Relevance to the World Today" which featured presentations by Elaine Pagels, well known for her studies and writing on the Gnostic Gospels (Beyond Belief: A Different View of Christianity); New Testament scholar Bart D. Ehrman (Jesus and the Apocalyptic Vision), and scholar of religion and Professor, Marvin Meyer (Magdalene in the Gnostic Gospels: From the Gospel of Mary to the DaVinci Code, Mary Magdelene in History and Culture). In 1976, Robert Ornstein and Idries Shah presented a seminar, Traditional Esoteric Psychologies in Contemporary Life, in cooperation with The New School, New York City.

In 2010, ISHK set up a web site for a project entitled The Human Journey. It aims to "follow humanity from our origins in Eastern Africa and the Middle East to the present day, with an eye to what comes next."

See also
 Human behavior
 Lateralization of brain function
 Psychology
 The Institute for Cultural Research (1965–2013)
 The Idries Shah Foundation (2013 onwards)

References

External links
 Institute for the Study of Human Knowledge (ISHK) web site
 Institute for the Study of Human Knowledge: The Human Journey
 Share Literacy

Book publishing companies based in the San Francisco Bay Area
Psychology organizations based in the United States
Consciousness studies
Companies based in Santa Clara County, California
Educational charities based in the United States
Organizations based in the San Francisco Bay Area
Los Altos, California
Publishing companies established in 1969
1969 establishments in California